The action of 18 March 1748 was a naval engagement during the War of Jenkins' Ear in which a fleet of six Royal Naval vessels captured a number of merchantman in a successful engagement against a Spanish convoy escorted by nine ships of the line and frigates.

Battle
Six British warships were patrolling off Cape St. Vincent under the command of Captain Thomas Cotes. They ranged in size from the 70-gun HMS Edinburgh, under Cotes's command, through the 60-gun Eagle, Windsor, and Princess Louisa, to the 24-gun Inverness and the frigate Gax. Lookouts sighted a Spanish convoy, and Cotes pursued it. The British caught up with the tail end of the convoy and an action ensued.

The escorting Spanish ships of the line were Soberbio (74), Leon (74), Oriente (70), Colorado (70), Brillante (64), Pastora (64), Rosario (60), Xavier (54) and Galga (54). Three merchant ships, from Cádiz to Vera Cruz, and two others for Cartagena, were intercepted and captured out of a Spanish fleet of 17 merchantmen, under a convoy of nine ships of the line. The rest of the convoy managed to escape under cover of darkness with their escorting ships.

References 
Notes

Bibliography
 

External links
 Soberbio 

Conflicts in 1748
Battles of the War of Jenkins' Ear
Naval battles involving Great Britain
Naval battles involving Spain